Günther's frog (Hylarana guentheri) is a species of frog in the family Ranidae found in China, Hong Kong, Macau, Taiwan, Vietnam, and possibly Cambodia and Laos.

Günther's frog may also refer to:

 Günther's banded tree frog (Hypsiboas fasciatus), a frog in the family Hylidae found in Bolivia, Brazil, Colombia, Ecuador, French Guiana, Guyana, Peru, Suriname, and possibly Venezuela
 Günther's marsupial frog (Gastrotheca guentheri), a frog in the family Hemiphractidae found in Colombia and Ecuador
 Günther's robber frog (Craugastor omiltemanus), a frog in the family Craugastoridae endemic to Mexico
 Günther's streamlined frog (Nannophrys guentheri), an extinct frog in the family Dicroglossidae that was endemic to Sri Lanka
 Günther's tree frog (Rhacophorus maximus), a frog in the family Rhacophoridae found in China, India, Nepal, Thailand, Vietnam, and possibly Bangladesh

Animal common name disambiguation pages